Traversetolo is a comune (municipality) in the Province of Parma in the Italian region Emilia-Romagna, located about  west of Bologna and about  south of Parma. 

Traversetolo borders the following municipalities: Canossa, Lesignano de' Bagni, Montechiarugolo, Neviano degli Arduini, Parma, San Polo d'Enza.

Twin towns
 Oraison, France
 Majano, Italy

References

Cities and towns in Emilia-Romagna